Motor Mania is a cartoon released by Walt Disney Productions on June 30, 1950. In this madcap motoring animation, Goofy (during his "Everyman" period) transforms into a Mr. Hyde-type split personality, when he gets behind the wheel and provides the lowdown on how to not drive safely.

Plot
The cartoon shows how the character, as the pleasant, friendly, and good-natured "Mr. Walker" who "wouldn't hurt a fly nor step on an ant", undergoes a Jekyll-and-Hyde-like change in personality to the violent "Mr. Wheeler, motorist" when he gets behind the wheel of his yellow car.  As Mr. Walker, pedestrian, he's polite, safe, and good-natured while as Mr. Wheeler; he is very mean, reckless, and predatory. Upon reaching his destination in town (he apparently only wanted to buy a newspaper) and leaving his automobile, he reverts to the mild-mannered Mr. Walker, whereupon he is the victim of other motorists' unsafe (and sometimes even predatory) driving habits.  However, once he returns to his car, he becomes Mr. Wheeler, motorist, again, seeking to impose his own will upon traffic, to the point of blaming the tow truck which hauls him away for his slow pace after his own auto accident, and breaks the fourth wall by telling the narrator, while educating him (and the fourth wall) on safe driving habits with, "Aw, shaddap!"

The car
The car that Goofy drives is a yellow Lincoln-Zephyr convertible. Although not every detail is correct on the cartoon car in relation to the original, its deep, growling sound is unmistakable.

Historical significance
This is first Goofy cartoon to have Goofy redesigned, with a lack of both floppy external ears and frontal teeth. It was also the first to use a jazz remake of the theme song used in Goofy shorts prior.
Was used as an army commercial film in 1955.
This cartoon reveals that road rage is not a recent phenomenon, but also an issue recurring with each generation of drivers.
Due to its subtle topicality, it and two 1965 Goofy cartoons about freeway safety, Freewayphobia#1 and Goofy's Freeway Troubles, have been shown in driving schools across the continent.
This short was awarded the Buyer Trophy for the best film on traffic safety.
In D-TV, clips from this cartoon were set to the Beach Boys' "I Get Around".
Mr. Walker makes a cameo reading a newspaper in Toontown in Who Framed Roger Rabbit.
In the House of Mouse episode "Max's New Car", after getting banned from getting a car from Goofy, Max Goof also showed clips of this cartoon (with altered audio) to prove how Goofy was a 'responsible' driver.

Home media
The short was released on December 2, 2002, on Walt Disney Treasures: The Complete Goofy.

Voice cast
 Goofy: Pinto Colvig
 Narrator: John McLeish

References 

1950 films
1950 animated films
1950s Disney animated short films
Goofy (Disney) short films
Dr. Jekyll and Mr. Hyde films
Films directed by Jack Kinney
Films produced by Walt Disney
Films scored by Paul Smith (film and television composer)
Animated films about automobiles
1950s English-language films